The Korean yen was the currency of Korea between 1910 and 1945. It was equivalent to the Japanese yen and consisted of Japanese currency and banknotes issued specifically for Korea. The yen was subdivided into 100 sen. It replaced the Korean won at par and was replaced by the South Korean won and the North Korean won at par.

Banknotes 

Denominations included 10 sen, 20 sen, 50 sen, 1 yen, 5 yen, and 10 yen. The sen notes were vertical and resembled the Japanese sen notes of 1872 and the Japanese military yen at the turn of the century. These notes were redeemable in "Japanese Currency at any of its Branches in Korea".

In 1909, the Bank of Korea (1909) (韓國銀行) was founded in Seoul as a central bank and began issuing currency of modern type. Following the establishment of the Bank of Korea, it would immediately begin to issue its own banknotes, these new banknotes were redeemable "in gold or Nippon Ginko notes." Most of the reserves held by the Bank of Korea at the time were banknotes issued by the Bank of Japan and commercial paper. 
  
The banknotes issued by the Bank of Korea were only very slightly modified from the earlier Dai-Ichi Bank banknotes that had circulated in Korea, this was done to reduce any possible confusion during the transition period. The name of the Bank of Korea was inserted and the royal plum crest of Korea replaced Dai-Ichi Bank's 10-pointed star emblem, and the reverse sides of the 1 yen banknotes changed colour, but all the overall the changes were minute.

Bank of Korea notes were dated 1909 and issued in 1910 and 1911. After Korea lost sovereignty to Japan in 1910, the Bank of Korea was renamed the Bank of Chosen (朝鮮銀行, Korean: Joseon Eunhaeng, Japanese: Chōsen Ginkō). The first Bank of Chosen note was dated 1911 and issued in 1914. 1 yen, 5 yen, 10 yen, and 100 yen were issued regularly, while there were occasionally some sen notes (5, 10, 20, 50 sen). 1000 yen was printed but never issued at the end of World War II. The earlier issues were redeemable "in Gold or Nippon Ginko Note". A similar phrase was written in Japanese on later issues.

Sen

1916

1919

1937

Yen

1911

1932

1938

1944

1945

See also
 Bank of Korea (1909–1950)

References

Korea under Japanese rule
Modern obsolete currencies